ScreenX is a panoramic film format which presents films with an expanded, dual-sided, 270-degree screens projected on the walls in a theater. First introduced in 2012, it is created by CJ 4DPLEX, a subsidiary of the CJ CGV group which also created the 4DX motion-theater technology, which, in fact, uses a similar logo and combines both formats, known as "4DX Screen". Co-developed by KAIST, it is considered a "sideways" version of IMAX and a presumed competitor to streaming platforms such as Netflix. In addition to films, the ScreenX theater also shows advertisements filmed or converted for the format.

As of 2022, the theater technology is installed in 364 screens in 37 countries.

Technical aspects

Like for IMAX films, in order to match the length of the entire tri-screen theater, ScreenX films are formatted either through pre-production (shooting) or post-production (converting). A film shot for ScreenX is typically shot with three cameras. The process is done through scene selecting, archiving, delivering assets, color grading, and mastering before distribution to theaters.

The majority of films produced for ScreenX are live-action films, mostly from South Korea and Asia, and only a few animated films (as well as family films) are ever shown in/produced for the format. Despite its innovation, the technology has been rarely produced for Hollywood-studio films due to the complexity of the additional computer animation work as side footage. Lee Jae-seon, who worked for the ScreenX version of King Arthur: Legend of the Sword at G-node, said that, "It is not easy to create Hollywood blockbuster CG work in Korea, but it is meaningful because we created Hollywood blockbuster CG work for ScreenX.” Additionally, films were initially shown only in selected locations due to the lack of partners at the time.

On December 13, 2019  the largest ScreenX auditorium in the world was inaugurated at the Màgic Badalona shopping centre in Badalona, Spain. It has a capacity of 398 seats. India, which is home to a massive cinema audience got its first Screen X in July 2019 at INOX  Megaplex at Mumbai, Maharashtra.

Box office performance
Since 2018, the ScreenX technology has proven to be successful at the worldwide box-office, following the successful panoramic release of Marvel Studios' Black Panther. It has grossed a combined total of over $40 million throughout the year through films released in the panoramic format.

In 2022, ScreenX has achieved even more-successful box-office results, with Top Gun: Maverick being the highest-grossing release.

4DX Screen
4DX Screen (formerly "4DX with ScreenX") is the combination of the ScreenX and 4DX film formats which allows moviegoers to experience films in the multi-screen auditorium with enhanced motion and environmental effects, with an additional fourth-screen projected on the ceiling and the newest 4DX chair models. It debuted at a theater in Yongsan in 2017, and was internationally unveiled at CinemaCon 2018, and later at CES 2020. The combined film format is currently operating throughout Asian territories including South Korea, Japan, China and India. It later opened its first theater in a non-Asian location at a Les Cinémas Gaumont Pathé theater in Paris, France. It later made its overseas debut at a Cinépolis theater in Mexico City, Mexico in March 2020.

Films

Awards
 2018: 'ScreenX' won the 2018 ShowEast "Innovator of the Year" award.
 2018: '4DX with ScreenX' won the Silver Prize at the 2018 Edison Awards for "Media, Visual Communications & Entertainment".
 2019: 'ScreenX' won "Technology of the Year" at the 2019 Cinema Technology Community Awards.
 2019: '4DX with ScreenX' won the iResearch Award for "Originative Cinema Technology".

See also
Barco Escape - A similar multi-screen theater which is now closed.
4DX
IMAX
Dolby Cinema
CJ CGV
Cinerama - A similar technique from the 1950s.

References

External links

Official Twitter (Korean)
Official Facebook
Official YouTube (Korean)
Official YouTube

Motion picture film formats
South Korean inventions
Film formats
Film and video technology
CJ CGV

Multi-screen film